The India Billie Jean King Cup team represents India in the WTA & ITF Billie Jean King Cup professional tennis competition and are governed by the All India Tennis Association.  They will compete in the Asia/Oceania Zone of Group I in 2016.

History
India competed in its first Fed Cup in 1977, but did not compete again until 1991. Since 1991, India has been competing annually (except 1993). India's best result was reaching the Asia/Oceania Group I final in 2006.

In 2004, Manisha Malhotra and Sania Mirza broke the record for playing the longest tiebreak (21-19) in their doubles match against Uzbekistani pair Vlada Ekshibarova and Ivanna Israilova.

Current team 

Win–loss as of 16 April 2022, rankings as of 16 April 2022.

Players

Results

2000s

2010s

2020s

References

External links

Billie Jean King Cup teams
Fed Cup
Fed Cup